Dr. Hilowle Imam Omar is a Somali politician who hails from the Harti abgaal clan (a subclan of abgaal). He took part in the Somali National Reconciliation Conference in Kenya. He was a member of the USC a former Mogadishu based faction.

References 

Year of birth missing (living people)
Living people
United Somali Congress politicians